Lilioceris is a genus of beetles in the leaf beetle family, Chrysomelidae. The genus was first scientifically described in 1912 by Edmund Reitter. Lilioceris belongs to the subfamily Criocerinae and tribe Criocerini (Latreille, 1807).

The family of beetles are of importance in horticulture because of their impact on the cultivation of lilies. Lilioceris cheni was introduced into Central Florida by biologists to try to control the spread of invasive air potato plants.

Description 
Species of Lilioceris are between 4 and 10 mm long. The body has a long narrow shape, with a pronounced shoulder between the elytra and pronotum. Both the larvae and the adult (imago) beetles feed on plants.

Lifecycle 
Lilioceris species are holometabolous, having a complete metamorphosis. The larvae proceed to a pupation stage to develop into adults.

Diversity
Well over 100 species are described, with 80 in Asia alone.

Selected species:
Lilioceris apicalis Yu in Yu, 1992
Lilioceris brancuccii Medvedev, 1992
Lilioceris cheni Gressit & Kimoto, 1961
Lilioceris chodjaii Berti & Rapilly, 1976
Lilioceris dentifemoralis Long, 1988
Lilioceris faldermanni (Guérin-Méneville, 1829)
Lilioceris hitam Mohamedsaid, 1990
Lilioceris jianfenglingensis Long, 1988
Lilioceris kimotoi Mohamedsaid, 1991
Lilioceris laetus Medvedev, 1992
Lilioceris laysi Mohamedsaid, 2000
Lilioceris lianzhouensis Long, 2000
Lilioceris lilii (Scopoli, 1763)
Lilioceris merdigera (Linnaeus, 1758)
Lilioceris nepalensis Takizawa, 1989
Lilioceris parallela Mohamedsaid, 1999
Lilioceris rondoni Kimoto & Gressitt, 1979
Lilioceris schneideri Weise, 1900
Lilioceris thailandicus Medvedev, 2005
Lilioceris tibialis (Villa, 1838)
Lilioceris vietnamica Medvedev, 1985
Lilioceris xinglongensis Long, 1988
Lilioceris yuae Long, 2000

References

Bibliography

External links 

 BioLib.cz Lilioceris
 Fauna Europaea Lilioceris
Liliocerus cheni on the UF / IFAS Featured Creatures website.

Chrysomelidae genera
Criocerinae
Taxa named by Edmund Reitter